was a private junior college in Wakayama, Wakayama, Japan. It was established in 1972.

History 
 1972 Junior College was set up in Gobō, Wakayama.
 1986 Campus was moved to Wakayama, Wakayama.
 2000 The last year of registration of students.
 2002 Junior College was discontinued.

Names of Academic department 
 English literature

See also 
 List of junior colleges in Japan

Japanese junior colleges
Universities and colleges in Wakayama Prefecture